Sharikabad-e Miluiyeh (also Romanized as Sharīkābād-e Mīlūīyeh; also known as Sharīkābād and Sharīkābād-e Mīlūyeh) is a village in Golashkerd Rural District, in the Central District of Faryab County, Kerman Province, Iran. At the 2006 census, its population was 163, in 37 families.

References 

Populated places in Faryab County